Giustino Menescardi (1720–1776) was an Italian painter and scenic designer, active in Northern Italy and Venice in a late Baroque style.

Biography
Little is known about his training. His works appear to display the influence of Tiepolo. In the Carnavals of 1756 and 1757, he collaborated with Francesco Grassi in the scenography for the Teatro Ducale and in the commedie francesi being enacted in the Theater of Colorno. On the 28 of January he was paid 704 lire for his work as a scenographer in the French opera  Zelindor e Gl'Inca in Perù, the work il balli de Selvaggi, and the work Aci e Galatea. He painted the canvas of St Augustine triumphs over Heresy for the church of Santo Stefano, Venice. he also painted for the Sala dell'Archivio of the Scuola Grande dei Carmini and in the Ducal Palace of Venice.

A Resurrection of Christ attributed to Menascardi is in the Hood Museum of Art at Dartmouth College.

References

External links
Italian Paintings, Venetian School, a collection catalog containing information about the Menescardi and his work (see index; plate 48).

1720 births
1776 deaths
18th-century Italian painters
Italian male painters
Painters from Venice
Italian Baroque painters
18th-century Italian male artists